The 2018 Rugby Europe Sevens Conferences are the lower divisions of Rugby Europe's 2018 sevens season. Conference 1 is held in Zenica, Bosnia and Herzegovina, with the two top-placing teams advancing to the 2019 Trophy, while Conference 2 is held in Tallinn, Estonia, with the top two advancing to Conference 1 for 2019.

Conference 1

Will be held in Zenica, Bosnia and Herzegovina on 23–24 June.

Pool Stage

Pool A

Pool B

Pool C

Knockout stage

Challenge Trophy

5th Place

Cup

Conference 2

Will be played in Tartu, Estonia on 14–15 July.

External links
 Conference 1 page
 Conference 2 page

References

Conferences
2018 rugby sevens competitions
2018 in Bosnia and Herzegovina sport
2018 in Estonian sport